William Edward Baxter (1825 – 10 August 1890) was a Scottish businessman, Liberal politician and travel writer.

Background and education
Born in Dundee, Angus, Baxter was educated at the High School of Dundee and the University of Edinburgh. He was the son of Edward Baxter, a benefactor and reformer who had opposed the corn laws. He became a partner in his father's firm of Edward Baxter & Co. (afterwards W. E. Baxter & Co.).

Political career
Baxter was Liberal Member of Parliament for Montrose Burghs from 1855 to 1885, and served under William Ewart Gladstone as Secretary to the Admiralty from 1868 to 1871 and as Financial Secretary to the Treasury from 1871 to 1873.
He was appointed a Privy Councillor in 1873. He was also President of the first day of the 1883 Co-operative Congress.

He retired from Parliament in 1885.
When the Liberal Party split over the issue of Irish Home Rule in 1886, Baxter supported the Unionist faction until his death.

Family
William Edward Baxter was the grandson of William Baxter, the founder of the Baxter Brothers textile business. His uncle, Sir David Baxter, was a noted businessman and philanthropist and his aunt, Mary Ann Baxter was the co-founder of University College, Dundee.

W. E. Baxter's eldest son was Edward Armitstead Baxter who married Isobel Scott-Elliot.  His second son, Sir George Washington Baxter (1853–1926), followed his father into politics, being a leading figure in the Unionist Party in Scotland in the early 20th-century. In 1908 he sought election in Dundee as a Liberal Unionist candidate, but was defeated by the Liberal Winston Churchill. Sir George, was active in the running of the Liberal Unionist and Unionist Parties in Dundee, served as President of the Scottish Unionist Association in 1920. Sir George also continued the family involvement with University College, serving as its president.

Writings
Baxter published various works on foreign travel.
 Impressions of Central and Southern Europe, London, 1850, 8vo.
 The Tagus and the Tiber, or Notes of Travel in Portugal, Spain, and Italy, London, 1852, 2 vols. 8vo.
 America and the Americans, London, 1855, 8vo.
 Hints to Thinkers, or Lectures for the Times, London, 1860, 8vo.

Personal life
After a long period of ill health, W. E. Baxter died at his home, Kincaldrum House, near Forfar in August 1890.

In November 1847, he married Janet, eldest daughter of J. Home Scott, a solicitor of Dundee. By her he had two sons and five daughters.

References

External links 
 
 

1825 births
1890 deaths
People educated at the High School of Dundee
Alumni of the University of Edinburgh
Members of the Privy Council of the United Kingdom
Scottish Liberal Party MPs
UK MPs 1852–1857
UK MPs 1857–1859
UK MPs 1859–1865
UK MPs 1865–1868
UK MPs 1868–1874
UK MPs 1874–1880
UK MPs 1880–1885
Presidents of Co-operative Congress
Writers from Dundee
19th-century Scottish businesspeople
19th-century Scottish people
19th-century Scottish writers
Scottish travel writers
Members of the Parliament of the United Kingdom for Scottish constituencies
Liberal Unionist Party politicians
Politicians from Dundee
Businesspeople from Dundee